The Jāmeh Mosque of Amol ( – Masjid-e-Jāmeh Amol) is the grand, congregational mosque (Jāmeh) of Amol, Mazandaran Province, Iran. Mosque location in Amol Sassanid Bazaar. Its primary structure dates to the first century AH and during the reign of the Qajar dynasty and Safavid dynasty renovation.

See also
 List of Mosques in Iran

References

Mosques in Iran
Tourist attractions in Amol
Tourist attractions in Mazandaran Province
11th-century mosques
National works of Iran
Amol